The Cape clawed frog, Cape platanna or Gill's platanna (Xenopus gilli) is a species of frogs in the family Pipidae endemic to South Africa. Its natural habitats are Mediterranean-type shrubby vegetation, freshwater marshes, intermittent freshwater marshes, and ponds.
It is threatened by habitat loss.

References

Xenopus
Endemic amphibians of South Africa
Taxonomy articles created by Polbot
Amphibians described in 1927